Zhang Wenzhao (born 28 March 1987) is a Chinese footballer.

Club career
Zhang Wenzhao started his football career after graduating from Shenzhen Kingway in 2006. His ability to play on the left flank saw him establish himself within the team during the 2007 season. While playing as a regular for the club throughout the 2008 season, he was unable to help the club's struggles in the top tier.

Zhang attracted interest from fellow top tier side Changchun Yatai and he transferred to the club in the 2009 season. He made his debut for the club on 28 March 2009 in a 1–0 win against Jiangsu Sainty. It wasn't until Shen Xiangfu became manager during the 2010 season did Zhang become a regular for the club. He scored his first goal for the club on 7 May 2010 in a 3–2 loss against Henan Jianye.

In January 2014, Zhang signed with fellow top tier side Shandong Luneng. He made his debut for the club on 7 March 2014 in a 1–0 win against Harbin Yiteng. He scored his first goal for the club on 6 April 2014 in a 1-0 win against Shanghai Shenxin.

On 7 July 2016, Zhang transferred to fellow Chinese Super League side Guangzhou Evergrande. He made his debut for the club on 17 July 2016 in a 2–1 away win against Changchun Yatai, coming on for Gao Lin in the 76th minute. On 5 August 2017, he scored his first goal for Guangzhou in a 3–0 home win over Tianjin Teda.
On 27 February 2019, Zhang was loaned to fellow top tier side Beijing Renhe for the 2019 season.

International career
Zhang made his debut for the Chinese national team on 6 October 2011 in a 2-1 win against the United Arab Emirates.

Career statistics

Club statistics
.

International statistics

Honours

Club
Shandong Luneng
Chinese FA Cup: 2014
Chinese FA Super Cup: 2015

Guangzhou Evergrande
Chinese Super League: 2016, 2017
Chinese FA Cup: 2016
Chinese FA Super Cup: 2017, 2018

References

External links
 
 Player stats at sohu.com (Chinese)

1987 births
Living people
Sportspeople from Anshan
Chinese footballers
Footballers from Liaoning
China international footballers
Shenzhen F.C. players
Changchun Yatai F.C. players
Shandong Taishan F.C. players
Guangzhou F.C. players
Beijing Renhe F.C. players
Chinese Super League players
China League One players
Association football wingers